The athletics competition at the 1973 Southeast Asian Peninsular Games were held at the National Stadium, Singapore. Athletics events was held between 2 September to 5 September.

Medal summary

Men

Women

Medal table

References

 Yesterday's results - The Straits Times, 3 September 1973, Page 24
 Yesterday's results - The Straits Times, 4 September 1973, Page 24
 Yesterday's results - The Straits Times, 5 September 1973, Page 24
 Yesterday's results - The Straits Times, 6 September 1973, Page 24
 1973 South-East Asian Games (SEA Games), intersportstats.com
 Southeast Asian Games. GBR Athletics. Retrieved 2020-02-08.

Southeast Asian Games
Athletics
1973
1973 Southeast Asian Games